The island of Panay in the Philippines is home to various species of reptiles and amphibians.

The following list is from Ferner, et al. (2000). (?) denotes the identification of the species is uncertain, although the genus is clearly identified.

Frogs
Frogs (Anura) that are endemic to the Visayas belong to the genera Kaloula, Limnonectes, and Platymantis.

Bufo marinus (Cane toad)
Fejervarya cancrivora cancrivora (Rana cancrivora)
Fejervarya vittigera (Rana vittigera)
Kaloula conjuncta negrosensis
Kaloula picta
Kaloula sp.
Limnonectes leytensis (?)
Limnonectes visayanus
Occidozyga laevis (Common puddle frog)
Platymantis corrugatus
Platymantis dorsalis
Platymantis negrosensis
Platymantis insulatus
Platymantis panayensis
Platymantis paengi
Platymantis sp. 1
Platymantis sp. 2
Platymantis sp. 3
Rana erythraea (Common green frog)
Rana everetti (Hylarana albotuberculata) (?)
Polypedates leucomystax (Common tree frog)

Turtles
Cuora amboinensis amboinensis

Lizards
Bronchocela sp.
Draco spilopterus
Hydrosaurus pustulatus
Gonocephalus sp.
Cosymbotus platyurus
Cyrtodactylus annulatus
Cyrtodactylus philippinicus
Gehyra mutilata
Gekko gecko (Tokay gecko)
Gekko gigante
Gekko mindorensis
Hemidactylus frenatus (Common house gecko)
Hemidactylus stejnegeri
Hemiphyllodactylus insularis
Lepidodactylus lugubris
Lepidodactylus planicauda
Brachymeles boulengeri taylori
Brachymeles talinis
Brachymeles tridactylus
Dasia grisea
Dasia semicincta
Emoia atrocostata
Lamprolepis smaragdina philippinica
Lipinia pulchella taylori
Mabuya indeprensa
Mabuya multicarinata borealis
Mabuya multifasciata
Otosaurus cumingii
Parvoscincus sisoni
Sphenomorphus arborens
Sphenomorphus coxi divergens
Sphenomorphus jagori grandis
Sphenomorphus steerei
Tropidophorus grayi
Varanus salvator nuchalis

Snakes
Acrochordus granulatus
Python reticulatus
Ahaetulla prasina preocularis
Boiga angulata
Boiga cynodon (?)
Boiga dendrophila (?)
Calamaria gervaisi
Cerberus rynchops
Chrysopelea paradisi
Cyclocorus lineatus alcalai
Dendrelaphis caudolineatus terrificus
Dendrelaphis pictus pictus
Elaphe erythrura psephenoura
Gonyosoma oxycephala
Hologerrhum dermali
Lycodon aulicus capucinus
Oligodon modestum
Psammodynastes pulverulentus
Pseudorabdion mcnamarae
Pseudorabdion oxycephalum
Pseudorabdion talonuran
Tropidonophis negrosensis
Zaocys luzonensis
Calliophis calligaster gemianulis
Hydrophis belcheri
Hydrophis cyanocinctus
Hydrophis elegans
Hydrophis inornatus
Lapemis hardwickii
Laticauda colubrina
Ramphotyphlops braminus
Rhamphotyphlops cumingii
Typhlops castanotus
Typhlops hypogius (= Typhlops ruber ?) ?
Tropidolaemus wagleri (?)
Trimereserus flavomaculatus

Sources
Ferner, John W., et al. 2000. The Amphibians and Reptiles of Panay Island. Philippines Asiatic Herpetological Research Vol. 9, pp. 1–37.

'
'
'
Philippines